Glipa angustatissima is a species of beetle in the genus Glipa. It was described in 1911.

References

angustatissima
Beetles described in 1911